Fagius is a surname. Notable people with the surname include:

 Hans Fagius (born 1951), Swedish organist
 Paul Fagius (1504–1549), German scholar